West Craven is an area in the east of Lancashire, England in the far northern part of the borough of Pendle. Historically the area was within the ancient county boundaries of Yorkshire and was administered as part of the Skipton Rural District of the West Riding of Yorkshire until 1974.

After 1974 and becoming part of the Pendle borough of Lancashire, the area that was formerly in the larger Craven area of the West Riding of Yorkshire has been known as West Craven owing to its cultural links with Yorkshire.

Towns and villages in West Craven are: Barnoldswick, Earby, Sough, Kelbrook, Salterforth and Bracewell and Brogden.  There is a West Craven Area Committee for Parish Councils in the area.

West Craven is also the name of a ward of Craven district in North Yorkshire, adjoining the West Craven area in Lancashire.  The ward includes the parishes of Broughton, Carleton, Elslack, Martons Both and Thornton in Craven.

References

External links
 West Craven Online Homepage
 Barnoldswick Town Council Website
 BBC Sunday Stroll in Foulridge - including photography of West Craven from Noyna
 Lancashire Parishes Website
 Lancashire County Libraries Local Studies
 North West Development Agency Press Release 2005
 West Craven High School

Local government in the Borough of Pendle
History of Yorkshire
Geography of the Borough of Pendle